The 2013 Big Ten softball tournament was held at Bowlin Stadium on the campus of University of Nebraska–Lincoln in Lincoln, Nebraska from May 9 through May 12, 2013. As the tournament winner, Wisconsin earned the Big Ten Conference's automatic bid to the 2013 NCAA Division I softball tournament.

Tournament

Schedule

All-Tournament Team
 Sara Driesenga (Michigan)
 Ashley Lane (Michigan)
 Alex Davis (Minnesota)
 Sara Moulton (Minnesota)
 Tatum Edwards (Nebraska)
 Emily Lockman (Nebraska)
 Amy Letourneau (Northwestern)
 Cassidy Bell (Penn State)
 Andie Varsho (Purdue)
 Cassandra Darrah (Wisconsin)
 Stefanni LaJeunesse (Wisconsin)
 Maria Van Abel (Wisconsin)

Tournament MVP
 Cassandra Darrah (Wisconsin)

References

2013 Big Ten Conference softball season
Big Ten Tournament
Big Ten softball tournament